Ichneutica pelanodes is a moth of the family Noctuidae. It is endemic to New Zealand and has been found in scattered locations in the North, South and Stewart Islands. I. pelanodes is easily confused with I. skelloni as the two species are visually extremely similar. In the North Island though the range of the two species appears not to overlap. Generally of the two species I. pelanodes tends to be darker in appearance. I. pelanodes inhabits wetlands but the life history of this species is unknown as are the host species of its larvae. Adults are on the wing from October to February and are attracted both to sugar and light traps.

Taxonomy 
This species was first scientifically described by Edward Meyrick in 1931 using a male specimen collected by George Hudson in January at National Park. The holotype specimen is held at the Natural History Museum, London. In 1988 J. S. Dugdale placed this species within the Graphania genus. In 2019 Robert Hoare undertook a major review of New Zealand Noctuidae species. During this review the genus Ichneutica was greatly expanded and the genus Graphania was subsumed into that genus as a synonym. As a result of this review, this species is now known as Ichneutica pelanodes.

Description 
Meyrick described the species as follows:
The wingspan of the adult male is between 30 and 37 mm where as the wingspan for the female is between 33 and 36 mm. Although this species can be easily confused with I. skelloni, the two species have North Island ranges that do not overlap. I. pelanodes is found only in districts from Northland to Taupo and I. skelloni is only found in the Wellington district. Also I. pelanodes tends to be darker in appearance and female I. skelloni forewings often have paler pinkish ochreous colour in comparison to the other species. The two species are also distinguishable via the shape of the male genitalia.

Distribution 
It is endemic to New Zealand. It is found in scattered locations in the North, South and Stewart Islands. In the North Island it can be found from Northland to Taupō and in the South Island from Fiordland and Otago Lakes. It has only been collected at Mason Bay at Stewart Island.

Habitat 

I. pelanodes prefers to inhabit wetlands.

Behaviour 
This species is attracted to sugar traps. Adult I. pelanodes are also attracted to light and are on the wing from October to February.

Life history and host species 
The life history of this species is unknown as are the host species of its larvae.

References

Moths described in 1931
Hadeninae
Moths of New Zealand
Endemic fauna of New Zealand
Taxa named by Edward Meyrick
Endemic moths of New Zealand